Hellinsia glochinias is a moth of the family Pterophoridae. It is found in Brazil and Costa Rica.

The wingspan is 26–28 mm. The head is ochreous-whitish, more or less irrorated with fuscous or dark fuscous except on the anterior half of the crown. The antennae are ochreous-whitish, with a cloudy fuscous line above. The thorax is pale whitish-ochreous finely sprinkled with fuscous. The abdomen is ochreous-whitish, more or less sprinkled with fuscous on the sides. The forewings are pale whitish-ochreous slightly tinged with brownish, more or less thinly and finely sprinkled with dark fuscous. The hindwings are grey. Adults are on wing in June.

References

Moths described in 1908
glochinias
Moths of South America
Moths of Central America
Fauna of Brazil